María del Carmen "Carme" Contreras i Verdiales (4 October 1932 – 6 July 2020) was a Spanish stage, film, and television actress.

Biography
Born in Zaragoza as María del Carmen Contreras Verdiales, she spent much of her life in Barcelona and Catalanized her name to Carme Contreras i Verdiales. A voice actress, she dubbed, from English into Spanish and Catalan, "E.T." in E.T. the Extra-Terrestrial and "Mama Fratelli" in The Goonies, among many other characters.

Contreras i Verdiales died on 6 July 2020, aged 87.

Theatre
 1954: La ferida lluminosa, by Josep Maria de Sagarra at the Teatre Romea in Barcelona 
 1954: 16 February. Rueda de amores by Teatre de Cambra and the Teatre Romea (both Barcelona) 
 1957: No és mai tard...si s'arriba d'hora, by Jaume Villanova i Torreblanca at Teatre Romea in Barcelona 
 1970: Els dimecres...Elena by Muriel Resnik at the Teatre Romea in Barcelona 
 1973: Berenàveu a les fosques, by Josep Maria Benet i Jornet at the Teatre CAPSA in Barcelona 
 2010: Salvem les balenes by Ivan Campillo at the Versus Teatre

Film
 1952 La forastera 
 1955 El hombre que veía la muerte 
 1961 Plácido 
 1970 El certificado 
 1977 Strange Love of the Vampires 
 1978 Serenata a la claror de la lluna
 1980 Mater amatísima
 1981 Dos pillos y pico 
 1983 El pico
 1984 El último penalty
 2001 Faust 5.0
 2006 El perfum: història d'un assassí
 2007 Presumptes implicats
 2012 REC 3: Génesis

Television
 2000. El cor de la ciutat

References

1932 births
2020 deaths
People from Zaragoza
20th-century Spanish actresses
21st-century Spanish actresses
Spanish actresses
Spanish film actresses
Spanish stage actresses
Spanish television actresses
Spanish voice actresses